Sar Mashhad (also known as Sar Meshad) is a village in Dadin Rural District, Jereh and Baladeh District, Kazerun County, Fars Province, Iran. At the 2012 census, its population was 3,047, in 623 families. 

The place is notable for being the site of a Sasanian rock relief made during the reign of king (shah) Bahram II. The relief portrays him as a hunter who has slayed a lion whilst throwing his sword at another. His wife is holding his right hand in a signal of safeguard, whilst the high priest Kartir and another figure, most likely a prince, are watching. The scenery has been the subject of several symbolic and metaphorical meanings, thought it is most likely supposed to portray a simple royal display of braveness during a real-life hunt. An inscription of Kartir is underneath the relief.

Population 

This village is located in  Dadin district and according to the census of the Statistics Center of Iran in 2016, its population was 2818 people (748 families).

Language 
The inhabitants of this village are from Qashqai tribe, Farsimdan tribe and speak Qashqai Turkish.

Distance from important cities 
 Kazeroon  65  km
 Shiraz    169 km
 Ishahan   540 km
 Tehran    970 km

See also 
 Kazerun
 Qashqai people
 Bishapur

References

Sources

Further reading 
 

Populated places in Kazerun County
Archaeological sites in Iran